Southern Cross is a rural locality in the Charters Towers Region, Queensland, Australia. In the  Southern Cross had a population of 542 people.

Geography
The locality is mainly rural, except for a small area in the south-east which adjoins the city of Charters Towers. This area is best described as rural-residential, and is included in the boundaries of "Charters Towers North" published by the Charters Towers Regional Council.

History
The former railway station of Southern Cross, on the Great Northern railway line, which was opened in 1884, was just over the boundary in the locality of Black Jack, Queensland. A  crossing loop is located in the immediate vicinity.

Southern Cross Provisional School opened circa 1895. On 1 January 1909 it became Southern Cross State School. It closed circa 1932.

In the  Southern Cross had a population of 542 people.

References 

Charters Towers Region
Localities in Queensland